The Buffalo Bulls football program is the intercollegiate American football team for the University at Buffalo located in the U.S. state of New York. The team competes at the NCAA Division I level in the Football Bowl Subdivision and is a member of the Mid-American Conference. Buffalo's first football team was fielded in 1894. The team plays its home games at the 25,000+ seat UB Stadium on University at Buffalo's north campus in Amherst, New York. The Bulls are coached by Maurice Linguist.

History

UB's first run with football started in 1894 and lasted until 1970, when the football program was suspended due to the student body's vote to stop funding the program. The football program was reintroduced in 1977. When reintroduced, the team played in Division III level football until 1992. In 1993, the school made the jump to Division I-AA. In 1999, the Bulls moved up again to Division I-A Bowl Subdivision level football.

Early history (1894–1903)

In 1894, UB established an athletics association and fourteen UB Medical students formed the first UB football team. By 1896, they were a local force in Western New York football playing collegiate and club teams and finishing the season with an impressive 9–1–2 record. In 1897, C. W. Dibble coached UB to a perfect 7–0–0 record  beating Syracuse twice.  In 1899, Bemus Pierce coached UB to a 6–0 record. This likely made Pierce the first American Indian head coach in college football. In 1900, Buffalo beat Penn State 10–0.  In 1901, former player James B. "Turk" Gordon coached the UB team to a 4–2 record.  In 1903, Ray Turnbull led the UB team to a 3–3 record.  After the 1903 season, UB would not again put a team on the field until 1915.

The UB Bisons (1915–1930)
In 1915, UB re-established the football program and officially instituted men's basketball. Both teams were named the 'Bisons' and used as their logo a caricature of a male American bison, often outfitted in a UB jersey. Frank Mount Pleasant was called on to coach the football team but was replaced the following season after a 3–4 record. Art Powell would take over in 1916 and coach the team for six seasons (13–22–5). In 1920, UB would start playing on what would eventually be called Rotary Field. UB would go through two coaches in a span of two years – 'Dim' Batterson  in 1922 and James Bond in 1923 – before Russ Carrick would take over, serving five seasons despite winning only five games (while losing 30 and garnering two ties). The team would last be known as the Bisons under the command of Jay "Biffy" Lee, who coached for two seasons (until 1930), leading UB to an 8–7 record.

Welcome the Bulls (1930–1942)
In 1931, the University changed its mascot to the Bulls in order to distinguish UB from professional teams in the Queen City. The Bulls played every year until the outbreak of World War II mainly under the coaching guidance of Jim Peele who was at the helm from 1935 to 1942 and led the Bulls to a 38–34–1 record including a 6–2 season in 1942.

Post-World War II (1946–1954)
After World War II, UB again took to the gridiron under Peele, who led UB in two impressive seasons of 7–2 (1946) and 8–1 (1947), but were not selected to a bowl in either season. The program was next taken over by Frank Clair, who coached for two seasons, leaving with an impressive mark of 12–4–1. The following season represented one of the low points for UB when, under the guidance of coach Fritz Febel, UB won only four games in three years with an overall record of 4–19–1.

Offenhamer era (1955–1965)
If the Febel season can be seen as one of the high points in UB football history, then Dick Offenhamer brought in UB's most successful era when from 1955 to 1965, he would coach UB to an impressive 58–37–5 record.  In 1958, the football team won the Lambert Cup, emblematic of supremacy in Eastern U.S. small-college football. That led to the team's first bowl invitation, to the Tangerine Bowl in Orlando, Florida against Florida State University.  However, the Orlando Elks Lodge, the bowl's sponsor, told the Bulls that they would be allowed to participate only if back-up defensive end Mike Wilson and starting halfback Willie Evans, who were black, did not play.  Despite protests from the Elks Lodge, the local high school association that operated the stadium – the Orlando High School Athletic Association – refused to rescind its rule against integrated events.  The team stood behind the two, and unanimously refused the bowl offer. The team was profiled on ESPN's Outside the Lines in 2008. Buffalo would not be invited to a bowl or be bowl-eligible for another 50 years.

Several UB football stars from the Offenhamer years went on to have careers in professional football, including quarterback John Stofa with the American Football League's Miami Dolphins and Cincinnati Bengals, and defensive lineman Gerry Philbin with the AFL's New York Jets, and Buddy Ryan who was on Offenhamer staff as the defensive line coach. Philbin is a member of the AFL Hall of Fame and the All-time All-AFL Team. Philbin and UB's Willie Ross were the first two UB graduates to play on professional football championship teams: Ross with the 1964 AFL Champion Buffalo Bills; and Philbin with the 1968 AFL Champion New York Jets, who went on to win Super Bowl III.  They have been followed by Ramon Guzman who played on two Grey Cup Championship teams with the Montreal Alouettes and James Starks with the Super Bowl XLV champion Green Bay Packers.

Out with a whimper (1965–1970)
Following the departure of Offenhamer in 1965, UB lasted only five more years before suspending football in 1970. There was some success under coach Doc Urich, who led UB to an 18–12 record over three years, but declining performance under his successor, Bob Deming (1969–1970) and financial issues caused UB to suspend its football program.  The main reason that football was dropped was that the student body voted to stop funding the team.  At the time athletics at UB were fully funded by student fees.  It would be seven years until UB would again take the field.

Division III football (1977–1992)

In 1977 UB began playing football at the NCAA Division III level under Coach Bill Dando, who would be the Bulls' longest serving coach, lasting thirteen years. UB had moderate success during his tenure, and he retired after the 1989 season. Sam Sanders would take over, but lasted only two seasons. His coaching career ended because of medical issues and Jim Ward was promoted because of a New York State hiring freeze and ushered in UB's return to Division I football. In 1986 the Bulls upset Villanova for their biggest win of the season. Douglas Engel was named Freshman Defensive player of the year (1986–87).

Division I-AA (1993–1998)
UB's return to Division I football started in Division I-AA (known today as the Football Championship Subdivision). UB would have only one winning season during their time in I-AA. Under Coach Craig Cirbus, UB would go 8–3 in 1996. This would be UB's last season at or above .500 for a dozen years.

Return to Division I-A (1999–2005)

In 1999 UB joined the Mid-American Conference in Division I-A (Football Bowl Subdivision) football. They retained their head coach from their I-AA seasons, Craig Cirbus.  After a few years of dismal results, the team hired Jim Hofher, a former head coach at Division I-AA Cornell University to be the head coach.  However, Hofher's teams were marked by poor discipline and lack of effort, and won only eight games during his five seasons at UB.  Buffalo won only 10 games and lost 69 during this seven-year period, the second-worst record in the Football Bowl Subdivision during that time. A 2002 win on the road over Rutgers was their only win against a BCS team until 2013.

Turner Gill era (2006–2009)
In early December 2005, Hofher was replaced by Green Bay Packers assistant coach and former Heisman Trophy candidate Turner Gill.  The former University of Nebraska quarterback led the program in a remarkable turnaround, helping the team to a 5–7 (5–3 MAC East divisional co-champions) in 2007, their best season since the school joined the MAC.

On November 21, 2008, the Buffalo Bulls won their first outright MAC Eastern Division Championship, sealing the win with a thrilling 2-OT victory over Bowling Green, 40–34. Down 27–7 at the beginning of the 4th quarter, the Bulls stormed back to tie the game at 27 and force it into overtime. In the second OT, running back James Starks ran 25 yards on the first play for a touchdown and a Bulls win.  The quarterback coach for Bowling Green that day was former UB head coach Jim Hofher.

Following a loss to Kent State that broke a five-game winning streak for Buffalo, the Bulls entered the conference title game at 7–5, while MAC West champion Ball State was an unblemished 12–0. However, on December 5, at Ford Field in Detroit, Buffalo's defense returned two fumbles for touchdowns and the Bulls defeated the Cardinals, 42–24, to become Mid-American Conference champions for 2008.  Their successful season earned the Bulls an invitation to the International Bowl in Toronto, Ontario to face Connecticut.  The Bulls went on to lose that game to UConn by a score of 38–20.

2009 would not be as successful as Starks was lost before the season even started to a shoulder injury.  The offense also struggled without four-year starting quarterback Drew Willy as new quarterback Zach Maynard had an up-and-down season as UB finished 5–7. After the season, Gill left to become head coach of Kansas.

Jeff Quinn era (2010–2014)
On December 20, 2009, it was first reported that Jeff Quinn would be the new head coach.  He took over after coaching Cincinnati in the 2010 Sugar Bowl. In Quinn's first season as coach, he was unable to build upon Gill's success as UB finished the season 2–10.  Over the subsequent two seasons he amassed a record of 7–17.

The Bulls entered the 2013 season with low hopes. These were accentuated with season-opening losses to No. 4 Ohio State and No. 23 Baylor, 20–40 and 13–70, as they started the season 0–2. However, after a quintuple overtime 26–23 victory against Stony Brook in week 3, the team surged to 7 straight wins, including a 41–12 victory over Connecticut at UB Stadium on September 28, their first win against a BCS opponent since 2002, and clinched bowl eligibility for just the third time in team history with a 41–21 victory at Kent State on October 26. The 7 game winning streak was the longest winning streak in Bulls team history, and ended with a 41–51 loss at the Glass Dome to Toledo on November 12. The team finished the regular season 8–4, and finished in second place in the conference. The team ultimately went on to play in the Famous Idaho Potato Bowl against San Diego State, losing the game 24–49. The team finished with an overall record of 8–5.  This 2013 team featured Khalil Mack who went 5th overall in the 2014 NFL Draft to the Oakland Raiders, making him the highest player in Buffalo history to ever be drafted, as well as the highest defensive player in the Mid-American Conference to ever be drafted.  This team also featured the undrafted Branden Oliver, who broke James Starks's rushing record of most rushing yards in school history.  Oliver signed with the San Diego Chargers and was thrust into the starting lineup during the 2014 NFL season after early season injuries to Ryan Mathews, Danny Woodhead and Donald Brown.

Quinn was dismissed partway through the 2014 season after accumulating a 3–4 record.

Lance Leipold era (2015–2020)

Lance Leipold, who spent eight seasons as the head coach of the Division III University of Wisconsin at Whitewater (where he won six championships), was hired as the Bulls' next head coach shortly after the 2014 season. In June 2017, the university received state approval for the construction of an $18 million indoor athletic training facility, slated to be built just north of UB Stadium. Buffalo would be the last school in the MAC without such a facility.

In 2018, Leipold led the Bulls to a 10–2 regular season en route to MAC East division title.

The 2019 season saw Buffalo win their first bowl game in program history, defeating the Charlotte 49ers at the 2019 Bahamas Bowl.

The pandemic-shortened 2020 season saw star running back Jaret Patterson burst on to the national stage, including getting his name floated in Heisman Trophy talk. In his game against Kent State, he rushed for over 400 yards and tied the FBS record for touchdowns in a game with 8. Buffalo also received their first national ranking in program history in week 15, coming in at No. 24 in the AP Poll. After Buffalo finished the regular season undefeated at 5–0, their ranking increased to No. 23. The season culminated in their second consecutive bowl win in the Camellia Bowl. Leipold departed the Bulls after the season to take over the Kansas Jayhawks.

Maurice Linguist era (2021–present)
Maurice Linguist was hired away from the University of Michigan.

Conference affiliations
Buffalo has been both an independent and affiliated with conferences, including periods where no team was fielded.

 Independent (1894–1903)
 No team (1904–1914)
 Independent (1915–1925)
 New York State Conference (1926–1934)
 Independent (1935–1942)
 No team (1943–1945)
 Independent (1946–1970)
 No team (1971–1976)
 Independent (1977–1998)
 Mid-American Conference (1999–present)

Championships

Conference championships 
Buffalo has won one conference championship, doing so after beating Ball State in the 2008 MAC Championship Game 42–24.

Division championships
As winners of the Mid-American Conference's East Division, Buffalo has made three appearances in the MAC Championship Game, in 2008, 2018, and 2020. The Bulls also shared the Division title with Miami in 2007, but the tie-breaker allowed the RedHawks to represent the division in the championship game.

† Co-champion

Bowl games
Buffalo has participated in six bowl games, with a bowl game record of 3-3.

The 1958 Buffalo team declined the Tangerine Bowl invitation due to Florida's segregation laws at the time which would not have allowed Buffalo's two black players to participate.

Head coaches
Buffalo has been led by the following head coaches.

†  Interim

Notable players

NFL/AFL drafted players

Khalil Mack was drafted by the Raiders fifth overall in the 2014 NFL Draft. Mack holds the all-time NCAA record for forced fumbles and is also tied for career tackles for loss in the NCAA. In 2015, he became the first first-team All-Pro in NFL history to be elected in two different positions in the same year, as a defensive end and outside linebacker. Mack was named the NFL Defensive Player of the Year for the 2016 season.

Undrafted NFL players

Other notable players
Marc Panepinto, later a New York State Senator
Paul Snyder, Sr., businessman and eventual owner of the Buffalo Braves basketball team
Brent Pry. Virginia Tech football head coach

Broadcasting

WWKB acquired the broadcast rights to Bulls games for the 2014 season. Former WIVB-TV sports anchor Paul Peck on play-by-play and former Navy quarterback Jim Kubiak on color commentary are expected to return. The Bulls previously aired their games on WHLD (2013), WECK (2008–12) and WGR.

A separate feed is available from the student Part 15 radio station, WRUB.

As a member of the Mid-American Conference, ESPN Inc. holds television rights to UB Bulls games. They are typically only broadcast online via ESPN3, with local radio personality Sal Capaccio on play-by-play, with some games sub-leased to American Sports Network's Buffalo affiliate, WNYO-TV.

All-time vs. MAC teams

Results through the 2019–20 college football season.

This table includes all MAC games from 1999, the year the Bulls joined the Mid-American Conference.

Future non-conference opponents 
Announced schedules as of February 2, 2023.

References

External links

 

 
American football teams established in 1894
1894 establishments in New York (state)